The Jerry Ford Invitational was a celebrity pro-am golf tournament hosted by former President Gerald Ford. It was played in Vail, Colorado from 1977 to 1996. In years that there was a tied for first place, no playoff was held.

Winners

References

Pro–am golf tournaments
Golf in Colorado
Gerald Ford
Recurring sporting events established in 1977
Recurring sporting events disestablished in 1996
1977 establishments in Colorado
1996 disestablishments in Colorado